Audio Learning Center was an American rock band from Portland, Oregon.

Biography 

Audio Learning Center was formed in the fall of 1998 by Christopher Brady and Steven Birch (formerly of bands Pond and Sprinkler respectively), along with Pond's David Triebwasser on drums, soon replaced by college student Paul Johnson.

The band were signed by Rich Egan, owner of Vagrant Records, releasing their debut, Friendships Often Fade Away in 2002, produced by Adam Kasper. In 2004, they released Cope Park, produced by Joe Chiccarelli. The band broke up soon after the release of their second album.

Members

 Christopher Brady - Bass, Vocals
 Steven Birch - Guitar, Backing Vocals
 Paul Johnson - Drums

Discography

Albums
Friendships Often Fade Away - April 6, 2002
Cope Park - February 26, 2004

External links
Official Vagrant Site

Rock music groups from Oregon
Musical groups from Portland, Oregon
1998 establishments in Oregon
2004 disestablishments in Oregon
Musical groups established in 1998
Musical groups disestablished in 2004